The  is the national legislature of Japan. It is composed of a lower house, called the House of Representatives (Shūgiin), and an upper house, the House of Councillors (Sangiin). Both houses are directly elected under a parallel voting system. In addition to passing laws, the Diet is formally responsible for nominating  the Prime Minister. The Diet was first established  as the Imperial Diet in 1890 under the Meiji Constitution, and took its current form in 1947 upon the adoption of the post-war constitution.

Composition

The houses of the National Diet are both elected under parallel voting systems. This means that the seats to be filled in any given election are divided into two groups, each elected by a different method; the main difference between the houses is in the sizes of the two groups and how they are elected. Voters are also asked to cast two votes: one for an individual candidate in a constituency, and one for a party list. Any national of Japan at least 18 years of age may vote in these elections, reduced from age 20 in 2016. Japan's parallel voting system is not to be confused with the Additional Member System used in many other nations. The Constitution of Japan does not specify the number of members of each house of the Diet, the voting system, or the necessary qualifications of those who may vote or be returned in parliamentary elections, thus allowing all of these things to be determined by law. However it does guarantee universal adult suffrage and a secret ballot. It also insists that the electoral law must not discriminate in terms of "race, creed, sex, social status, family origin, education, property or income".

Generally, the election of Diet members is controlled by statutes passed by the Diet. This is a source of contention concerning re-apportionment of prefectures' seats in response to changes of population distribution.  For example, the Liberal Democratic Party had controlled Japan for most of its post-war history, and it gained much of its support from rural areas.  During the post-war era, large numbers of people were relocating to the urban centers in the seeking of wealth; though some re-apportionments have been made to the number of each prefecture's assigned seats in the Diet, rural areas generally have more representation than do urban areas.  The Supreme Court of Japan began exercising judicial review of apportionment laws following the Kurokawa decision of 1976, invalidating an election in which one district in Hyōgo Prefecture received five times the representation of another district in Osaka Prefecture. In recent elections the malapportionment ratio amounted to 4.8 in the House of Councillors (census 2005: Ōsaka/Tottori; 
election 2007: Kanagawa/Tottori) 
and 2.3 in the House of Representatives (election 2009: Chiba 4/Kōchi 3).

Candidates for the lower house must be 25 years old or older and 30 years or older for the upper house. All candidates must be Japanese nationals. Under Article 49 of Japan's Constitution, Diet members are paid about ¥1.3 million a month in salary. Each lawmaker is entitled to employ three secretaries with taxpayer funds, free Shinkansen tickets, and four round-trip airplane tickets a month to enable them to travel back and forth to their home districts.

Powers

Article 41 of the Constitution describes the National Diet as "the highest organ of State power" and "the sole law-making organ of the State". This statement is in forceful contrast to the Meiji Constitution, which described the Emperor as the one who exercised legislative power with the consent of the Diet. The Diet's responsibilities include not only the making of laws but also the approval of the annual national budget that the government submits and the ratification of treaties. It can also initiate draft constitutional amendments, which, if approved, must be presented to the people in a referendum. The Diet may conduct "investigations in relation to government" (Article 62).

The Prime Minister must be designated by Diet resolution, establishing the principle of legislative supremacy over executive government agencies (Article 67). The government can also be dissolved by the Diet if it passes a motion of no confidence introduced by fifty members of the House of Representatives. Government officials, including the Prime Minister and Cabinet members, are required to appear before Diet investigative committees and answer inquiries. The Diet also has the power to impeach judges convicted of criminal or irregular conduct.

In most circumstances, in order to become law a bill must be first passed by both houses of the Diet and then promulgated by the Emperor. This role of the Emperor is similar to the Royal Assent in some other nations; however, the Emperor cannot refuse to promulgate a law and therefore his legislative role is merely a formality.

The House of Representatives is the more powerful chamber of the Diet. While the House of Representatives cannot usually overrule the House of Councillors on a bill, the House of Councillors can only delay the adoption of a budget or a treaty that has been approved by the House of Representatives, and the House of Councillors has almost no power at all to prevent the lower house from selecting any Prime Minister it wishes. Furthermore, once appointed it is the confidence of the House of Representatives alone that the Prime Minister must enjoy in order to continue in office. The House of Representatives can overrule the upper house in the following circumstances:
 If a bill is adopted by the House of Representatives and then either rejected, amended or not approved within 60 days by the House of Councillors, then the bill will become law if again adopted by the House of Representatives by a majority of at least two-thirds of members present.
 If both houses cannot agree on a budget or a treaty, even through the appointment of a joint committee of the Diet, or if the House of Councillors fails to take final action on a proposed budget or treaty within 30 days of its approval by the House of Representatives, then the decision of the lower house is deemed to be that of the Diet.
 If both houses cannot agree on a candidate for Prime Minister, even through a joint committee, or if the House of Councillors fails to designate a candidate within 10 days of House of Representatives' decision, then the nominee of the lower house is deemed to be that of the Diet.

Activities
Under the Constitution, at least one session of the Diet must be convened each year. Technically, only the House of Representatives is dissolved before an election. But, while the lower house is in dissolution, the House of Councillors is usually "closed". The Emperor both convokes the Diet and dissolves the House of Representatives but in doing so must act on the advice of the Cabinet. In an emergency the Cabinet can convoke the Diet for an extraordinary session, and an extraordinary session may be requested by one-quarter of the members of either house. At the beginning of each parliamentary session, the Emperor reads a special speech from his throne in the chamber of the House of Councillors.

The presence of one-third of the membership of either house constitutes a quorum and deliberations are in public unless at least two-thirds of those present agree otherwise. Each house elects its own presiding officer who casts the deciding vote in the event of a tie. The Diet has parliamentary immunity. Members of each house have certain protections against arrest while the Diet is in session and arrested members must be released during the term of the session if the House demands. They are immune outside the house for words spoken and votes cast in the House.
 Each house of the Diet determines its own standing orders and has responsibility for disciplining its own members. A member may be expelled, but only by a two-thirds majority vote. Every member of the Cabinet has the right to appear in either house of the Diet for the purpose of speaking on bills, and each house has the right to compel the appearance of Cabinet members.

Legislative process 
The vast majority of bills are submitted to the Diet by the Cabinet. Bills are usually drafted by the relevant ministry, sometimes with the advice of an external committee if the issue is sufficiently important or neutrality is necessary. Such advisory committees may include university professors, trade union representatives, industry representatives, and local governors and mayors, and invariably include retired officials. Such draft bills would be sent to the Cabinet Legislation Bureau of the government, as well as to the ruling party.

Buildings

The National Diet Library contains four buildings in one. These buildings include: the main building, the annex, the Kansai-kan of the National Diet Library and the International Library of Children's Literature.

Main Building
Has a centralized stack system and "For rapid movement of materials, the stack space is equipped with pneumatic carrier pipe and vertical/horizontal conveyor systems". Surrounding the stack space unit, the administrative space contains a catalog hall, reading rooms and research rooms for both general visitors and diet members.

Annex
Located North of the Main Building, "special design emphasis on natural and harmonious linkage with the Main Building". The annex also houses the exhibition room and an auditorium.

Kansai-kan of the National Diet Library
It is a facility in Keihanna Science City that acts as a storage space and the center for library services; for the advanced information communications society for library materials, information supply service, electronic library functions and enhanced documents.

International Library of Children's Literature
Contains the children's library, stacks and a researcher's reading room.

History

Japan's first modern legislature was the  established by the Meiji Constitution in force from 1889 to 1947. The Meiji Constitution was adopted on February 11, 1889, and the Imperial Diet first met on November 29, 1890, when the document entered into force. The first Imperial Diet of 1890 was plagued by controversy and political tensions. The Prime Minister of Japan at that time was General Count Yamagata Aritomo, who entered into a confrontation with the legislative body over military funding. During this time, there were many critics of the army who derided the Meiji slogan of "rich country, strong military" as in effect producing a poor country (albeit with a strong military). They advocated for infrastructure projects and lower taxes instead and felt their interests were not being served by high levels of military spending. As a result of these early conflicts, public opinion of politicians was not favorable.

The House of Representatives was directly elected, if on a limited franchise; universal adult male suffrage was introduced in 1925. The House of Peers, much like the British House of Lords, consisted of high-ranking nobles chosen by the Emperor.

The word diet derives from Latin and was a common name for an assembly in medieval European polities like the Holy Roman Empire. The Meiji Constitution was largely based on the form of constitutional monarchy found in nineteenth century Prussia and the new Diet was modeled partly on the German Reichstag and partly on the British Westminster system. Unlike the post-war constitution, the Meiji constitution granted a real political role to the Emperor, although in practice the Emperor's powers were largely directed by a group of oligarchs called the genrō or elder statesmen.

To become law or bill, a constitutional amendment had to have the assent of both the Diet and the Emperor. This meant that while the Emperor could no longer legislate by decree he still had a veto over the Diet. The Emperor also had complete freedom in choosing the Prime Minister and the Cabinet, and so, under the Meiji Constitution, Prime Ministers often were not chosen from and did not enjoy the confidence of the Diet. The Imperial Diet was also limited in its control over the budget. However, the Diet could veto the annual budget, if no budget was approved the budget of the previous year continued in force. This changed with the new constitution after World War II.

The proportional representation system for the House of Councillors, introduced in 1982, was the first major electoral reform under the post-war constitution. Instead of choosing national constituency candidates as individuals, as had previously been the case, voters cast ballots for parties. Individual councillors, listed officially by the parties before the election, are selected on the basis of the parties' proportions of the total national constituency vote. The system was introduced to reduce the excessive money spent by candidates for the national constituencies. Critics charged, however, that this new system benefited the two largest parties, the LDP and the Japan Socialist Party (now Social Democratic Party), which in fact had sponsored the reform.

List of sessions 
There are three types of sessions of the National Diet:
 R – jōkai (常会), regular, annual sessions of the National Diet, often shortened to "regular National Diet" (通常国会, tsūjō Kokkai). These are nowadays usually called in January, they last for 150 days and can be extended once.
 E – rinjikai (臨時会), extraordinary sessions of the National Diet, often shortened to "extraordinary National Diet" (臨時国会, rinji Kokkai). These are often called in autumn, or in the summer after a regular election of the House of Councillors (参議院議員通常選挙, sangiingiin tsūjōsenkyo) or after a full-term general election of the House of Representatives (衆議院議員総選挙, shūgiingiin sōsenkyo). Its length is negotiated between the two houses, it can be extended twice.
 S – tokubetsukai (特別会), special sessions of the National Diet, often shortened to "special National Diet" (特別国会, tokubetsu Kokkai). They are called only after a dissolution and early general election of the House of Representatives. Because the cabinet must resign after a House of Representatives election, the National Diet always chooses a prime minister-designate in a special session (but inversely, not all PM elections take place in a special Diet). A special session can be extended twice.
 HCES – There is a fourth type of legislative session: If the House of Representatives is dissolved, a National Diet cannot be convened. In urgent cases, the cabinet may invoke an emergency session (緊急集会, kinkyū shūkai) of the House of Councillors to take provisional decisions for the whole Diet. As soon as the whole National Diet convenes again, these decisions must be confirmed by the House of Representatives or become ineffective. Such emergency sessions have been called twice in history, in 1952 and 1953.

Any session of the National Diet may be cut short by a dissolution of the House of Representatives (衆議院解散, shūgiin kaisan). In the table, this is listed simply as "(dissolution)"; the House of Councillors or the National Diet as such cannot be dissolved.

List of House of Representatives general elections

19th century

20th century

21st century

List of House of Councillors regular elections

20th century 
1947 Japanese House of Councillors election
1950 Japanese House of Councillors election
1953 Japanese House of Councillors election
1956 Japanese House of Councillors election
1959 Japanese House of Councillors election
1962 Japanese House of Councillors election
1965 Japanese House of Councillors election
1968 Japanese House of Councillors election
1971 Japanese House of Councillors election
1974 Japanese House of Councillors election
1977 Japanese House of Councillors election
1980 Japanese House of Councillors election
1983 Japanese House of Councillors election
1986 Japanese House of Councillors election
1989 Japanese House of Councillors election
1992 Japanese House of Councillors election
1995 Japanese House of Councillors election
1998 Japanese House of Councillors election

21st century 
2001 Japanese House of Councillors election
2004 Japanese House of Councillors election
2007 Japanese House of Councillors election
2010 Japanese House of Councillors election
2013 Japanese House of Councillors election 
2016 Japanese House of Councillors election
2019 Japanese House of Councillors election
2022 Japanese House of Councillors election

See also

 Bicameralism
 Diet (assembly)
 Government of Japan
 History of Japan
 List of legislatures by country
 National Diet Building
 National Diet Library
 Parliamentary system
 Politics of Japan
 Parliament of the United Kingdom
 United States Congress
 :ja:国会開会式 – Opening ceremony of National Diet.

Notes

References

External links

 National Diet Library: Diet and Parliaments has the Diet minutes (in Japanese) and additional information.

 
1889 establishments in Japan
Japan
Japan